William David Frazer (January 11, 1884 – August 17, 1963) was an American sport shooter who competed in the 1924 Summer Olympics.

In 1924, he finished in 11th place in the 25 m rapid fire pistol competition.

He was born in Niagara Falls, New York and died in Seattle, Washington.

Frazer served as a colonel in the Coast Artillery Corps, U.S. Army.  While a major, he authored the book American Pistol Shooting (New York:  Dutton, 1929).

References

1884 births
1963 deaths
American male sport shooters
ISSF pistol shooters
Olympic shooters of the United States
Shooters at the 1924 Summer Olympics
Sportspeople from Niagara Falls, New York